The 2012 Serena Williams tennis season officially began on 2 January with the start of the 2012 WTA Tour. Williams won the most WTA singles titles of the season with seven, including two majors at Wimbledon and the US Open. She also won the WTA Championships and her first singles Olympics gold. She also suffered her first opening-round loss in a major at the French Open, losing to Virginie Razzano.

In doubles, Williams, partnering with sister Venus, dominated the grass court season by triumphing at Wimbledon and winning women's doubles gold medal at the Summer Olympics. Serena Williams was voted WTA Player of the Year for 2012, the fourth time she won the award. Based on her performance for the season, Williams was named as the International Tennis Federation world champion.

Year in detail

Early hard court season and Australian Open

Brisbane International
Williams began her 2012 season at the Brisbane International where she defeated Chanelle Scheepers in the first round in straight sets. At the second round, she faced Bojana Jovanovski and served for the match when she twisted her left ankle. She eventually won the match breaking the Serbians serve in the tenth game. However, the next day, she withdrew in her quarterfinals match against Daniela Hantuchová due to the same injury.

Australian Open
Williams then played the Australian Open where she was on a 14-match winning streak after winning the event in 2009 and 2010 but missing the 2011 edition. She was able to cruise pass the first three rounds. She beat Austrian Tamira Paszek in straight sets hitting 34 winners but also made 26 unforced error, in a first round match that started 30 minutes to 12 midnight. At the second round, she defeated Barbora Záhlavová-Strýcová winning the first set at love and breaking serve once and by doing so, she earned her 500th tour win. She then cruise pass Hungarian Gréta Arn with a loss of only 2 games to make through the fourth round. The match ended with 2 double faults and 59 minutes. At the fourth round, she suffered a surprising loss to Russian Ekaterina Makarova at the fourth match point of the Russian. At the time, Makarova was the lowest ranked player left in the draw. Williams hit 37 unforced errors and 7 double faults in 2 sets. The loss ended her 17 match winning streak at the Open.

She originally was set to participate in mixed doubles partnering with Andy Roddick. The team withdrew before their first round match due to Roddick's hamstring injury.

Sony Ericsson Open

Coming into the Sony Ericsson Open, Williams was attempting to break the record she shares with Steffi Graf of 5 titles and 7 finals at the event. She was also returning after a two-year hiatus with the 2009 edition was the latest edition she participated in. As the tenth seed, she received a bye in the first round. In the second round, she faced China's Zhang Shuai and won easily with 6 aces. She followed it up with a loss of only three games over Roberta Vinci. In the fourth round, she faced Samantha Stosur. Avenging her loss at the final of the 2011 US Open, she beat the Australian in two tight sets, while also serving 20 aces in the win, the most aces she has served in a match. Coming into her quarterfinals match-up against Caroline Wozniacki, she was the favorite as she had never lost to the Dane with a 3–0 record. However, she lost winning four games in both sets in an error-stricken match where she committed 34 winners and 36 unforced errors to Wozniacki's 12 winners and 13 unforced errors.

Clay court season and French Open

Family Circle Cup
Williams started her clay season campaign at the Family Circle Cup, having not played on clay since the 2010 French Open. As the fifth seed, she received a bye in the first round. In the second round, she faced Elena Vesnina and won with a break lead in each set, closing out the match win her 11th ace. In the next round, she faced New Zealand's Marina Erakovic and won with a double fault from Erakovic and with Serena winning 10 of the last 12 games. In her quarterfinals match, her opponent, Sabine Lisicki, had to retire after twisting her left ankle at 3rd game. In the semifinals, she faced Samantha Stosur whom just outlasted Venus Williams in her quarterfinals match. Williams dominated the match with a double breadstick win in just under an hour and breaking the Aussie five times. In the final, she met Lucie Šafářová for her first title of 2012. Williams dominated the match winning the first 9 games before the Czech got a game to avoid a double bagel defeat, it was the only game the Czech won in the match. With the win, she remained undefeated against the Czech. This was Williams' 40th singles title, second on Charleston and only her fourth on clay.

Mutua Madrid Open
Williams then played at the blue clay courts of the Mutua Madrid Open. In the first round she met Russian Elena Vesnina and won with 13 aces and 40 winners. In the second round she faced another Russian in Anastasia Pavlyuchenkova and swept pass the Russian with a straight sets victory. She then faced Caroline Wozniacki. Having lost their last match-up at Miami, a sluggish start from Williams looked similar to Miami as Wozniacki won the first set easily losing only one game. However, Williams avenged her loss at Miami and got back, winning the next two sets with 43 winners. In the quarterfinals she faced her third Russian opponent in the tournament, Maria Sharapova, with whom she had a 7–2 lead against Sharapova. Williams continued her streak with a victory and 11 aces. In the semifinals she ended the run of Czech qualifier, Lucie Hradecká. The first set was a tight contest with Williams edging Hradecká in the tie-break. The second set was a contrast with Williams winning with a bagel. In the final, she faced world no. 1, Victoria Azarenka, and dominated the match losing only four games in the victory. Williams hit 13 aces in the match and she also improved her record against Belorussian to 7–1. This was her 41st title putting her second in most titles among active players along with Kim Clijsters and behind her sister, Venus Williams, with 43. The win also moved her from 9th to 6th in the rankings.

Internazionali BNL d'Italia

Williams then played the Internazionali BNL d'Italia for her final preparation for the French Open.
In the first round, she faced Kazakhstan's Galina Voskoboeva for the first time and won with 24 winners in a late match that started at 10.30 PM. In the next round, she faced a tough match-up in the form of Nadia Petrova where their last four meetings went to deciding set. Williams led their head-to-head 6–3, but Petrova won their last 2 meetings. In the first set, the Russian edged it out winning it with a single break. In the second set being down triple break point on serve in the third game, Williams came back and took control of the match winning the final two sets. In the third round she defeated Anabel Medina Garrigues in straight sets. In the quarterfinals she faced Italian Flavia Pennetta but had an easy pass as Pennetta retired after being down 4–0, 40–0 on Williams serve due to a right wrist injury. Heading into the semifinals Williams led her opponent Li Na 5–1. However, Williams was forced to withdraw with a lower back injury as a precaution heading into the French Open.

French Open
Williams came to the French Open as the heavy favorite for the title. In the first round, the fifth seeded Williams was drawn against local player ranked 111th in the world, Virginie Razzano. She, surprisingly, lost to the Frenchwoman in three sets, marking the first time she lost in a grandslam opener in her career. Williams was two points away from victory nine times in the second set including leading 5–1 in the tiebreak. However, she failed to capitalize her chances and Razzano took the set and forced a third set to be played. Razzano quickly took control of the third set and, even though Williams managed to save seven match points, she fell to Razzano.

Williams also returned to mixed doubles competition for the first time since the 1999 Australian Open. She played with Bob Bryan and was drawn against Gisela Dulko and Eduardo Schwank in the first round. The pair lost to the Argentinians in a third set match tie-break.

Grass court season: Wimbledon Championships and the Olympics

Wimbledon Championships

Williams' came into the championships as a co-favorite with world no. 1 and top seed Maria Sharapova. Williams chose to come into the championships with no grass preparation. In the first round, she faced Barbora Záhlavová-Strýcová in No.2 Court, where older sister Venus fell the day before. After her first-round loss at the French Open, Williams looked nervous but still cruised through the first set, winning it with a double break. In the second set, she served for the match in the ninth game just to be broken, but she was able to break back in the next game to win. Her next opponent was Melinda Czink of Hungary; the American breezed pass the Hungarian with 7 aces to take the first set in 19 minutes. The second set was tighter, but Williams prevailed, breaking in the ninth game and then serving it out to advanced to the third round against China's Zheng Jie. Zheng kept toe-to-toe with Williams by holding her serve to force a tie-break, which Zheng won with the aid of a few errors from the American. However, Williams dominated the second set, winning it at two including winning the final 13 points of the set to force it to a decider. Both player kept their serve until the 4th game where Williams had to save 3 break points. The match went on serve until Williams broke in the 14th game and served it out. Williams also recorded 23 aces in the match, which was the most aces in a match by a female tennis player, breaking her own record of 20 aces which she set in her semifinal match against Elena Dementieva in Wimbledon 2009. Her next opponent was the first woman ever to score a 'Golden Set' in a Grand Slam event in the Open Era, Wild Card Yaroslava Shvedova of Kazakhstan. Williams dominated the first set, taking the first five games before Shvedova took a game, Williams eventually won the set. However, Shvedova came back in the second set, breaking the Williams serve twice to take the second. The third set came on serve until the tenth game, where Williams' broke and served out for the match on her first match point. In the quarterfinals, Williams faced defending champion Petra Kvitová. In the first set, Williams took the only break of the set at the sixth game and eventually took the set. The second set was tighter as Kvitová had set point at tenth game on the Williams serve; however, Williams saved it and broke in the next game to serve it out and advance to the semifinals. In the semifinals, she faced 2012 Australian Open champion Victoria Azarenka. Williams took care of the first set, winning it with a single break. In the second set, Williams broke early at the third game; however, the Belorussian broke back in the sixth game, as both players held serve to push the second set into a tie-break, which Williams won with her 24th ace in her second match point and first on her own serve. Williams broke her own record set in the third round of 23 aces. It was her fifth win in a row against Azarenka. Williams' opponent in the final was first-time Slam finalist Agnieszka Radwańska. Williams dominated the first set, winning it, winning the first five games and closing it out in the seventh game. Williams led by a break against the Polish no. 3 seed before a rain-delay. In the resumption of the match, Radwańska took advantage of a sloppy Williams, coming back and winning the set. In the final and deciding set, Williams took the final five games to take the match. It was Williams' fifth Wimbledon singles title, tying her with sister Venus; this is also her 14th Slam singles title and her first since 2010 Wimbledon. She also recorded 102 aces in the entire tournament, the most of any men and women. After the win she moved to number 4 in rankings. After she won the Wimbledon singles title, former world no. 1 John McEnroe described Williams as the greatest female player who has ever played the game.

Serena Williams also played doubles with sister Venus. The sisters were playing in their first doubles tournament since Wimbledon 2010. In the first round, they cruised past Vesna Dolonc and Olga Savchuk. In the second round they faced the Russian pairing and 4th seeds Nadia Petrova and Maria Kirilenko; the Williams sisters lost the first, but came back to take the second. The match was postponed once and was suspended twice; the match continued 3 days after the completion of the first two sets; the Russians took a 4–2 lead, but the American broke back and won the match. Later that same day, they played Bethanie Mattek-Sands and Sania Mirza and won. In their quarterfinal match, they faced compatriots Raquel Kops-Jones and Abigail Spears, dominating them by winning with a double breadstick. In the semifinals, they faced another American pairing, top seeds Liezel Huber and Lisa Raymond; after losing the first set, they came back and dominated the next two. In the final they faced the Czech pairing and 2011 French Open champions Andrea Hlaváčková and Lucie Hradecká and won, claiming their fifth Wimbledon doubles and 13th slam as a team.

London Olympics

Williams then came back to Wimbledon, one month after winning the title to represent the United States in the Olympics. In the first round she faced former number one Jelena Janković and won the match in just 61 minutes. She served 8 aces and did not face a single break point. She then competed against Poland's Urszula Radwańska in the second round. Williams won the first set with a break, and won the second set with a single break. Williams served 8 aces and had 26 winners in her one-hour-and-13-minute victory. Her third round match was a repeat of the 2010 Wimbledon Championships final, as she faced Vera Zvonareva. The American dominated the Russian as she won the first five games before the Russian won a game. Williams then won the last seven games to win the match in just 51 minutes. In the quarterfinals, she faced former number one Caroline Wozniacki of Denmark. Williams dominated the proceedings winning the first eight games before the Dane stopped her fifteen-game winning streak and won the ninth game of the match. However, Wozniacki could not break Williams' serve and the American closed out the match in 77 minutes. In the semifinals, she faced world number one Victoria Azarenka for the third time in 2012. Despite Azarenka's number one ranking, Williams dominated the match winning one and two and served 16 aces and did not face a single break point. In the final she faced Russian Maria Sharapova for the gold medal. Williams dominated the match taking the first nine games in just 45 minutes before her Russian opponent won a game. Williams then took the next three games to win for her 8th consecutive win against Sharapova. Williams served ten aces and two double faults to Sharapova's one and five. Williams also hit 24 winners to 7 unforced errors compared to Sharapova's six winners, and ten unforced errors. This win gave Serena a Career Golden Slam in Singles, only the second woman to do so.

Serena paired with sister Venus at the London Olympics in Women's Doubles, they are the defending champion from winning in the 2008 Beijing Olympics. In the first round, they defeated the Romanian pairing of Sorana Cîrstea and Simona Halep. They then won their next matches against German 5th seeds Angelique Kerber and Sabine Lisicki and the second seeds Italians Roberta Vinci and Sara Errani. In the medal rounds they faced the Russian pairing of Maria Kirilenko and Nadia Petrova who were the third seeds and won with a break lead in each set. In the final they defeated 4th seeds Andrea Hlaváčková and Lucie Hradecká of the Czech Republic at four in each set for the gold medal. This is the third gold medal in doubles for Serena and Venus making the sisters the only players to have won four gold medals in tennis. Venus won the Singles Gold Medal in 2000 in Sydney, Serena won the Singles Gold Medal in 2012 in London and they won the Doubles Gold Medals in 2000 in Sydney, 2008 in Beijing and 2012 in London. Serena has a Career Golden Slam in both singles and doubles and is the only player with that distinction.

US Open Series

Bank of the West Classic
Williams played Stanford directly after winning Wimbledon. Williams is coming in the tournament as the defending champion and top seed. She received a bye in the first round and faced American wild card Nicole Gibbs in the second round, despite looking sluggish due to jet-lag, the 14-time slam champion came through comfortably. In the quarterfinals she faced Chanelle Scheepers, the first set Williams' broke the South African's serve three times, while being broken twice herself and took the set. The second set was a lot easier, Williams took it without losing a game. She then faced Sorana Cîrstea, despite serving only 37% of first serves in, she routed the Romanian losing only 3 games. In the final she faced Lucky Loser Coco Vandeweghe, the first lucky loser to reach the final in 5 years. This also the first All-American final since the WTA Tour Championships in 2009. Williams took an early break lead in the first set but struggled serving on the sun and fell down with Vandeweghe serving for the set and had a set point but Williams came back to win the set in the twelfth game. Williams took an early break in the 4th game of the second set with a double fault from Vandeweghe and took the set and the title.

Western & Southern Open
After her Olympics victory, Williams then played at Cincinnati as her warm-up to the US Open. She received a bye into the second round, where she faced Greek player Eleni Daniilidou and won in straights despite making 44 unforced errors She then faced Urszula Radwańska in the round of 16 and took the first set after breaking late in the set. The second set saw Williams down a double break until she took the next 6 games to book her quarterfinal spot. In the quarterfinals she faced German Angelique Kerber, but lost at four in both sets after Kerber converted in her 3rd match point. This loss ended the American's third longest winning streak of 19 wins.

US Open

Williams came into the US Open trying to be the only third woman after Steffi Graf and sister Venus Williams to win Wimbledon-Olympics-US Open in the same year. She was the 4th seed in the event. In the first round she face compatriot Coco Vandeweghe and won in under an hour with Vandeweghe only managing to hold serve and break only once in the match. She then faced María José Martínez Sánchez in the next round, Williams won the first set quite comfortably, however in the second set she fell down by an early break until she came back and won the set.
In the third round she faced the woman who beat her in the fourth round of the Australian Open this year Ekaterina Makarova, the first set was toe-to-toe and was on serve until Williams broke in the tenth game of the first set to take it, the American then won the second set in a bagel.
In the next round Williams faced Andrea Hlaváčková, and won without dropping a game, earning her first double bagel in the US Open. Williams hit 31 winners to only 7 unforced errors. In the quarterfinals, she faced former number 1 Ana Ivanovic, where Williams saw her 23-game winning streak ended when Ivanovic won the 4th game of the first set. However, Williams cruised passed the Serbian winning the match in just 58 minutes. In the semifinals, the 2012 French Open finalist Sara Errani was awaiting. Errani didn't take a game until the sixth game of the match, with Williams closing it out the set in the next game. In the second set, the American broke the Italian twice to serve it out and advance to the Final. Williams didn't face a single break point in the match. In her sixth final, she faced world no. 1 and first time US Open finalist Victoria Azarenka. Williams lead their head-to-head 9–1. The first set saw the Serena Williams of the tournament and won the set with a double break by breaking the Azarenka serve. However, in the second set Azarenka broke in the very first game and took advantage winning the set. They then headed to the first 3-set women's final since 1995. Azarenka then took an early break advantage just to see Williams break right back. Azarenka however broke in the 7th game of the second set and held to serve for the title in the tenth game, but just to get broken. Azarenka then was serving to stay in the match at the twelfth game and was up 40–30 but got broken to hand the title to Williams. This is Williams' 4th US Open and 15th Slam.

Serena Williams also played doubles with sister Venus. In the first two-round they faced the team of Lindsay Lee-Waters and Megan Moulton-Levy, and the team of 15th seeds Klaudia Jans-Ignacik and Kristina Mladenovic. They won against the two teams in the same scoreline. In the third round they faced 4th seeds Maria Kirilenko and Nadia Petrova for the third time in the year. The Russian team gave the upset of the Women's doubles defeating the Williams Sisters.

WTA Tour Championships
Williams' came into the WTA Championships with no warm-up events having withdrawn from the Asian Swing. Williams ended in the red group with Victoria Azarenka, Angelique Kerber and Li Na. She played the first match of the tournament facing Kerber, to whom she lost their last encounter. Williams took the first three-game then lead but was pegged back by the German by taking the next 3 games. Williams then broke Kerber to take the set. Williams then took the last 5 games of the match to take the second set and the match. Williams made 26 winners and 20 unforced errors in the match. Her next opponent was China's Li. The match began with Williams breaking Li's serve. However Li was quick to strike back reeling off four games only to see Williams comeback to take four straight games herself. In the next four games the two traded breaks to send the set into a tie-breaker. Williams won it with ease. The second began by Li breaking Williams only to see Williams again reel off four games. The rest of the set went on serve until Williams closed out the match. Williams ended with 22 winners and 31 unforced errors in the match. In her final round robin match it was a rematch of the 2012 US Open finals against Azarenka. The match began with seven straight holds of serve until Williams broke in the ninth game just to broken back but Williams broke again when Azarenka double-fauled to give away the set. Azarenka began the second by reeling of three straight games. However she was unable to hold on as Williams won four straight games herself. Williams broke Azarenka in the tenth game to take the match with a double-fault. Williams have now improved her record against Azarenka to 11–1 and advancing into semifinals as the Red Group's top player with a 3–0 match win record and without the loss of a set. In the semifinals Williams' faced world no. 4 Agnieszka Radwańska. Williams reeled off an eight-game winning streak from the 4th game in the first set. Williams won the match and was accompanied by 39 winners. In the final, Williams faced Maria Sharapova in a rematch of the 2004 WTA Tour Championships. The first set was close with Williams winning the set 6–4. Williams started the first set by breaking the Sharapova serve and then broke Sharapova again to win the match. Williams didn't face a single break points and made 40 winners – 14 unforced errors to Sharapova's 13 – 12 Williams also made 11 aces in the match. This is Williams' third Year-End title and is the oldest woman to hold win the title. This win also meant that she has won the most titles in the season with 7.

Fed Cup
Williams' represented her team for their World Group II match against Belarus. This is the first time that Serena is playing Fed Cup since 2007. In her first rubber she faced Olga Govortsova and won in two sets. In her second rubber she faced Anastasia Yakimova, she struggled in the first set, however Williams' came back winning the last two sets easily. This win secured the United States Fed Cup team a spot in the 2012 Fed Cup World Group Play-offs. She then represented the US Fed Cup Team at the World Group Play-offs against Ukraine. This is the first time since 1999 that she represented Fed Cup outside of the United States. In both her rubbers she defeated Elina Svitolina and Lesia Tsurenko. With her teammates Christina McHale winning both her ties, and Liezel Huber and Sloane Stephens winning the doubles, the US Fed Cup team swept Ukraine 5–0 to advance to the 2013 Fed Cup World Group.

All matches

Singles matches

Doubles matches

Mixed Doubles matches

Tournament schedule

Singles schedule
Williams' 2012 singles tournament schedule is as follows:

Doubles schedule

Williams' 2012 doubles tournament schedule is as follows:

Mixed Doubles schedule

Williams' 2012 mixed doubles tournament schedule is as follows:

Yearly records

Head-to-head matchups
Ordered by percentage of wins, as of WTA Tour Championships

 Victoria Azarenka 5–0
 Maria Sharapova 3–0
 Samantha Stosur 2–0
 Elena Vesnina 2–0
 Barbora Záhlavová-Strýcová 2–0
 Chanelle Scheepers 2–0
 Agnieszka Radwańska 2–0
 Urszula Radwańska 2–0
 Coco Vandeweghe 2–0
 Caroline Wozniacki 2–1
 Bojana Jovanovski 1–0
 Tamira Paszek 1–0
 Gréta Arn 1–0
 Anastasia Yakimova 1–0
 Anabel Medina Garrigues 1–0
 Flavia Pennetta 1–0
 Roberta Vinci 1–0
 Marina Erakovic 1–0
 Sabine Lisicki 1–0
 Lucie Šafářová 1–0
 Lesya Tsurenko 1–0
 Elina Svitolina 1–0
 Nadia Petrova 1–0
 Olga Govortsova 1–0
 Zhang Shuai 1–0
 Anastasia Pavlyuchenkova 1–0
 Lucie Hradecká 1–0
 Galina Voskoboeva 1–0
 Melinda Czink 1–0
 Zheng Jie 1–0
 Yaroslava Shvedova 1–0
 Petra Kvitová 1–0
 Nicole Gibbs 1–0
 Sorana Cîrstea 1–0
 Jelena Janković 1–0
 Vera Zvonareva 1–0
 Eleni Daniilidou 1–0
 Ana Ivanovic 1–0
 Andrea Hlaváčková 1–0
 María José Martínez Sánchez 1–0
 Sara Errani 1–0
 Li Na 1–0
 Ekaterina Makarova 1–1
 Angelique Kerber 1–1
 Virginie Razzano 0–1

Finals

Singles: 7 (7–0)

Doubles: 2 (2–0)

Earnings

 Figures in United States dollars (USD) unless noted.

See also

 2012 WTA Tour

References

External links

2012 Serena Williams tennis season
Williams, Serena
2012 in American tennis